"All Loved Up" is a song recorded by Australian singer-songwriter Amy Shark. The song was released to radio on 3 August 2018  as the fourth single from Shark's debut studio album Love Monster. "All Loved Up" was the most added song on radio the week following its release. On 21 August 2018, Shark performed an acoustic version on Triple M.

At the APRA Music Awards of 2020, "All Loved Up" was nominated for Most Performed Pop Work of the Year.

Reception

Cameron Adams from Herald Sun, in an album review said "Jack Antonoff transports Shark into his '80s soundtrack world with "All Loved Up" — it's a Bleachers-style muted banger."

Jonathan Robles from Variance Magazine, in an album review called "All Loved Up" "simply perfect". Adding "It's bursting with that pulsating, windows-down-on-the-freeway energy reminiscent of fellow high-speed cuts such as Taylor Swift's "Out of the Woods", Lorde's "Green Light" and Bleachers' own "Rollercoaster"."

Isabella Trimboli from The Guardian said "All Loved Up" was "a clear standout" and said "[it] bears all the trappings of an Antonoff song: 80s-inspired instrumentation, thudding bass and a soaring, melodic chorus. Lyric-wise, it plays on Bruce Springsteen-reminiscent tropes of small town/big dreams".

Music Video
The music video was shot in Los Angeles and was directed by David O'Donohue and produced by Felicity Jayn Heath.

Track listing
 "All Loved Up" – 3:30

Charts

Certifications

Release history

References
 

2018 singles
Amy Shark songs
Sony Music Australia singles
Australian pop rock songs
Songs written by Jack Antonoff
Song recordings produced by Jack Antonoff
2018 songs
Songs written by Amy Shark